Reinhold Richard Priebus (born March 18, 1972) is an American lawyer and politician who served as White House Chief of Staff for President Donald Trump from January 20, 2017, until July 31, 2017. He also served as the chairman of the Republican National Committee (RNC) from 2011 to 2017.

Raised in Wisconsin, Priebus graduated from the University of Wisconsin-Whitewater and University of Miami School of Law in 1998. After working for the law firm Michael Best & Friedrich LLP, Priebus was elected as the chairman of the Wisconsin Republican Party in 2007. In 2009, he became the general counsel for the Republican National Committee. He won the 2011 Republican National Committee chairmanship election and took office in January 2011. As chairman, Priebus was the public face of the party and frequently criticized the policies of President Barack Obama. He presided over the Republican Party during the 2012 and 2016 presidential elections. He publicly criticized Trump during the early stages of the 2016 Republican presidential primaries, but he later called for party unity. He opposed efforts to deny Trump the nomination at the 2016 Republican National Convention and supported his presidential campaign in the general election.

Days after Trump won the 2016 presidential election, he announced that Priebus would serve as his first Chief of Staff. Priebus held the position until he resigned on July 27 2017. He had the shortest tenure of any non-interim White House Chief of Staff in American history. His last day in the position was July 31 when his successor John F. Kelly was sworn in. Priebus drew controversy for his management style as chief of staff.

Early life and legal career
Priebus was born on March 18, 1972, the son of Dimitra (née Pitsiladis; known as Roula) and Richard Priebus. Born in Dover, New Jersey, he lived in Netcong, New Jersey, until his family moved to Green Bay, Wisconsin, when he was seven years old. His father is a former union electrician and his mother a real estate agent. His father is of German and English descent and his mother is of Greek descent; she was born to parents originally from Mytilene and Khartoum, since there was a sizable community of Greek settlers in Sudan at the time.

At the age of 16, he volunteered for his first political campaign. He attended Tremper High School in Kenosha, Wisconsin, graduating in 1990. After graduating from Tremper, he attended the University of Wisconsin–Whitewater, where he majored in English and political science, and joined the Delta Chi fraternity. He graduated cum laude in 1994 and prior to that had been elected to serve as student body president.

After graduation from Whitewater, Priebus served as a clerk for the Wisconsin State Assembly Education Committee. He then enrolled at the University of Miami School of Law in Coral Gables, Florida. While there, he worked as a clerk for the Wisconsin Court of Appeals, the Wisconsin Supreme Court, and the United States District Court for the Southern District of Florida, and interned at the NAACP Legal Defense Fund in California.

In 1998, he graduated with a J.D. degree cum laude from the University of Miami, after serving as president of the law school student body. He moved back to Wisconsin and became a member of the state bar. Subsequently, he joined Wisconsin law firm Michael Best & Friedrich LLP, where he became a partner in 2006, practicing in the firm's litigation and corporate practice groups. He currently serves as president and chief strategist at Michael Best and is also chairman of the Board of Advisors.

Political career

Early political career

Priebus ran for election to the Wisconsin State Senate in 2004, losing 52–48 to the Democratic incumbent, Robert Wirch. In 2007, following a successful campaign, he was elected chairman of the Wisconsin Republican Party, the youngest person to have held that role to date. Two years later, in 2009, he also became the general counsel for the Republican National Committee.

As chairman of the Wisconsin Republican Party, Priebus led the party to success in the November 2010 elections in Wisconsin, which was previously a state held by the Democratic Party. The party won control of the State Senate and Assembly; a Republican candidate was elected to the governorship. He worked to bring Wisconsin's Tea Party movement together with the mainstream Republican party organization and avoid conflict between the two.

Priebus continued as state party chairman and general counsel to the RNC until 2010, when he stepped down as general counsel to run for election to chairman of the committee.

2011 RNC chairmanship election

On December 5, 2010, Priebus stepped down as general counsel for the Republican National Committee (RNC). The next day he sent a letter to all 168 voting members of the RNC announcing his candidacy for chairman. Wisconsin governor Scott Walker supported Priebus's bid from the beginning, attributing the party's victories in Wisconsin to "Priebus' leadership and involvement in the grassroots Tea Party movement that swept the state and the nation". Priebus told delegates in his letter: "I will keep expenses low. I will put in strong and serious controls. We will raise the necessary funds to make sure we are successful. We will work to regain the confidence of our donor base and I will personally call our major donors to ask them to rejoin our efforts at the RNC."

On January 14, 2011, after seven rounds of voting, Priebus was elected chairman of the Republican National Committee.

 Candidate secured a majority of votes in the round
 Candidate won plurality of votes in the round
 Candidate withdrew

RNC chairmanship

First term
At the start of his first term as chairman of the RNC in January 2011, Priebus had inherited a $23 million debt from his predecessor Michael Steele, as well as severely strained relationships with "major donors". Priebus stated that his goals for his leadership were to reduce the debt, rebuild the organization's finances and improve relationships with major donors and party leaders, as well as aiding Republican efforts in the 2012 presidential elections. In particular, he aimed to develop a strong voter mobilization program, including improved voter registration and absentee ballot programs to identify unregistered voters and those who had not returned their ballots, using funds raised through his initial outreach to major donors.

By the end of 2011, Priebus had raised more than $88 million and cut the RNC's debt to $11.8 million.

In the 2012 presidential election, Priebus was a frequent critic of Obama and Democratic leaders. In 2012 Priebus appeared on such political talk shows as Meet the Press, Face the Nation, Fox News Sunday, and State of the Union with Candy Crowley. Also in 2012, he continued to focus on rebuilding the RNC's finances by reaching out to donors, and at the end of the year the organization reported no debt.

After the Republican loss in the 2012 presidential election, Priebus called for Republicans to embrace comprehensive immigration reform that would afford illegal immigrants in the U.S. legal status. He also ordered reviews of RNC operations, including the party's messaging to young people, women, and Hispanics. The analysis of the election cycle would include gathering feedback from numerous volunteers and staffers who were involved at various levels. He began development of a political plan including a long-term strategy to reach demographic groups that had voted mainly Democratic in the November 2012 elections. The plan was labeled "The Growth and Opportunity Project".

On January 25, 2013, Priebus was elected to serve another term. Maine's National Committeeman Mark Willis attempted to challenge Priebus, but Willis could not garner the support of three states and so did not qualify for the ballot. Priebus therefore ran unopposed, and 166 of the 168 RNC members voted to reelect him (the two dissenters were from Maine).

Second term

For Priebus's second term he set the goal of "transforming the party – to be a force from coast to coast." In his re-election speech he stated that the party would no longer approach electoral politics from a "red and blue state" perspective.

On March 18, 2013, Priebus presented the completed Growth and Opportunity Project report developed from a listening tour and four-month analysis carried out by Priebus and Republican strategists including Ari Fleischer, Henry Barbour, Sally Bradshaw, Zori Fonalledas and Glenn McCall. The report outlined a comprehensive plan for the party to overhaul its operations. Specific plans outlined in the report included: improving the Republican Party's digital and research capabilities; a $10 million outreach effort to minority communities; supporting immigration reform; and reducing the length of the presidential primary season.

In September 2013, Priebus was successful in persuading both CNN and NBC to cancel planned biopics of Hillary Clinton, which had been criticized as "free campaigning on Clinton's behalf", according to columnist Jennifer Rubin. Priebus stated that the networks would not be allowed to moderate a Republican primary debate if the films went ahead.

The following year, Politico reported that Priebus had made progress with efforts to make the RNC a year-round operation, particularly through investment into digital technology and field staff.

Continuing Priebus's aim to create an initiative to rival the voter mobilization efforts of the 2012 Obama campaign, in May 2014, the RNC launched the Victory 365 program. The program focuses on communicating with and encouraging the efforts of volunteers across the U.S. to reach others in their communities.

Priebus also worked to reduce the length of the presidential primary calendar, generating support for a RNC rules change to make the primary calendar shorter by up to three months and bringing the national convention forward to late June at the earliest. The rules change was passed almost unanimously in January 2014.

Also following the Growth and Opportunity Project report (also called "the autopsy" and "the post-mortem"), Priebus led efforts to reach out to black, Latino and Asian American voters. In July 2014, he spoke at the National Association of Black Journalists convention, where he said that to support these efforts the Republican Party was spending approximately $8.5 million per month and had established offices in 15 states.

In a speech on October 2, 2014, Priebus laid out the RNC's "Principles for American Renewal", covering 11 goals of the Republican party in the lead up to the 2016 presidential election. The principles include three economy-related proposals for the Senate to move forward: approval of construction on the Keystone XL Pipeline; federal healthcare law reform; and a balanced budget amendment to the U.S. constitution. Other goals included in the principles include job creation, care of veterans, immigration reform and reducing government spending. Following the speech, the Democratic National Committee issued a statement criticizing Priebus, calling Republicans "out of step with the American public".

On January 16, 2015, Priebus was re-elected to a third term on a near-unanimous vote, making him the first chairman to lead the RNC for three consecutive terms with a Democratic president in the White House.

Third term

On October 30, 2015, after the third Republican presidential debate in Boulder, Colorado, in which there were clashes between the Republican candidates and the debate moderators, the RNC announced that NBC News would no longer host the February 26, 2016, debate in Houston. Priebus showed concerns that an NBC-hosted debate could result in a "repeat" of the CNBC debate, as both are divisions of NBCUniversal, although NBC News is editorially separate from CNBC. Priebus explained that CNBC had conducted the October 28 debate in "bad faith", arguing that "while debates are meant to include tough questions and contrast candidates' visions and policies for the future of America, CNBC's moderators engaged in a series of 'gotcha' questions, petty and mean-spirited in tone, and designed to embarrass our candidates. What took place Wednesday night was not an attempt to give the American people a greater understanding of our candidates' policies and ideas."

On April 22, 2016, Priebus appealed for party unity, regardless of who would become the Republican Party's nominee. After Donald Trump became the presumptive nominee, Priebus said in mid-May that running a third-party candidate would be tantamount to a suicide mission for the Republican Party.

After Trump won the Republican nomination, Priebus went on to forge a positive relationship with Trump and was personally involved in quashing efforts by anti-Trump delegates to prevent Trump's nomination. On October 4, 2016, Priebus called Trump a role model. "You know, I think everyone's a role model in different ways. When you look at someone who has built businesses, lost businesses, came back, lived the American dream, a person who sets goals, he's a winner."

Criticism of Trump

In December 2015, Priebus publicly criticized then-Republican presidential candidate Donald Trump's proposal to temporarily suspend Muslim immigration in response to terrorist attacks. "I don't agree", Priebus told The Washington Examiner. Following Trump's controversial remarks about Mexican illegal immigrants in 2015, Priebus reportedly delivered a "stern 40-minute lecture" to Trump.

In May 2016, Priebus again publicly criticized Trump, saying Trump was not the head of the Republican Party and that Trump must "change his tone."

On August 1, 2016, after Trump criticized the Gold Star family of Captain Humayun Khan, a Muslim soldier who was killed in Iraq and whose father criticized Trump, Priebus yet again criticized Trump publicly, stating "I think this family should be off limits, and we love them and I can't imagine being the father of a little girl and boy going through the unbelievable grief of them not coming home one day in battle."

A December 8, 2016, New York magazine article by Gabriel Sherman reported that "some Trump advisers are dismayed by Priebus's influence because they question the Washington insider's loyalty to the president-elect ... Three sources told me that shortly after the Access Hollywood tape leaked in early October, Priebus went to Trump's penthouse and advised the candidate to get out of the race," Sherman reported. This article contains no named sources aside from two members of the Trump administration, both of whom were cited to clear discrepancies in the otherwise unsourced article. Priebus announced days afterward in October that the RNC would continue to support Trump. According to author Michael Wolff's book Fire and Fury, Priebus referred to Trump as an "idiot."

White House chief of staff

On November 13, 2016, Trump announced his choice of Priebus for White House Chief of Staff. His pay of $179,000 tied White House Chief Strategist Steve Bannon and White House Director of Strategic Communications Hope Hicks for the highest White House salaries.

As White House chief of staff, Priebus held nearly singular control over who was and was not able to enter the Oval Office.  In one instance, after homeland security advisor Tom Bossert entered the office at Trump's request, "deputy chief of staff Katie Walsh spotted him entering the Oval Office and sprinted down the hallway to alert her boss, Mr. Priebus, according to a person familiar with the events. Mr. Priebus subsequently dashed into the office, where he reprimanded Mr. Bossert—in front of President Trump—for trying to meet with the president without him," The Wall Street Journal reported on February 14, 2017.

On February 19, 2017, Priebus said intelligence officials had cleared the Trump campaign of having any contact with Russian spies, contrary to anonymously sourced reports made the previous week by The New York Times, part of what the White House has referred to as "fake news". According to a Politico article dated March 17, 2017, a request by Priebus that the FBI refute allegations of contact by Trump associates with Russian intelligence "appears to have violated the White House's policy restricting political interference in pending investigations".

In a dispute over leaks from the White House, White House Communications Director Anthony Scaramucci tagged Priebus at the end of a (later deleted) Twitter post about such leaks, leading to speculation that Scaramucci considered Priebus responsible for them.  Priebus stated on CNN that he had resigned on July 27, 2017. The following day Donald Trump announced on Twitter that he had named John F. Kelly as new White House Chief of Staff. Kelly took office, ending Priebus' service, on July 31.  This gave Priebus the shortest tenure as permanent Chief of Staff in history, edging out Kenneth Duberstein, who served as Ronald Reagan's last chief of staff. Priebus remained in the White House "for a couple weeks" and assisted John Kelly with transitioning into his new role as White House Chief of Staff.

Post-White House
After leaving the White House, Priebus returned to private practice as president and chief strategist of Michael Best and Friedrich LLP, and signed to be a speaker with the Washington Speakers Bureau, working out of Washington, D.C. On June 10, 2019, Priebus was commissioned as an ensign in the United States Navy.

Priebus commissioned in the Navy Reserve as a Human Resources officer through its direct commission officer (DCO) program and was attached to the Navy Operational Support Center in Washington, D.C. He was sworn in by Vice President Mike Pence on June 10, 2019. Priebus noted his call to serve came after meeting with the wife and children of Senior Chief Petty Officer William "Ryan" Owens, a Navy SEAL who was killed early in the administration in a Special Operations raid in Yemen.

On February 11, 2020, Trump announced his intent to nominate and appoint Priebus to be a Member on the President's Commission on White House Fellowships.

Sometime after the September 29 election debate with Joe Biden, Priebus told a friend that Trump called him and acted out a script which included declaring victory prematurely on election night, if it appeared that he was ahead in the ongoing vote count.

In February 2021, it was reported that Priebus was considering running for governor of Wisconsin against Democratic incumbent Tony Evers in the 2022 election. In September 2021, he said he was not planning to run and praised Republican front-runner Rebecca Kleefisch.

Personal life
In 1999, Priebus married Sally L. Sherrow, whom he met in church when they were teenagers. They have two children. Priebus is an archon of the Greek Orthodox Church. Mr. Priebus has an older sister who was a physician in the U.S. Navy.

References

External links

 
 
 File at PolitiFact Wisconsin

|-

|-

1972 births
21st-century American politicians
American people of English descent
American people of German descent
American people of Greek descent
American people of Sudanese descent
Greek Orthodox Christians from the United States
Living people
People from Dover, New Jersey
Politicians from Kenosha, Wisconsin
People from Morris County, New Jersey
Politicians from Green Bay, Wisconsin
Republican National Committee chairs
Republican Party of Wisconsin chairs
Trump administration cabinet members
University of Miami School of Law alumni
University of Wisconsin–Whitewater alumni
White House Chiefs of Staff
Wisconsin lawyers
Wisconsin Republicans